John Merriman Reynolds (March 5, 1848 – September 14, 1933) was a lawyer, publisher and politician from the state of Pennsylvania.

Early life
Reynolds was born in Lancaster County, Pennsylvania, near Quarryville, about twelve miles south of the city of Lancaster, to parents Patrick Hewitt and Ann (née Barnett) Reynolds. His father, Patrick, was one of the well-to-do farmers of this locality and an influential citizen. He dealt quite extensively in livestock, and he also operated a grist-mill. Patrick, a native of Ireland, was eight years old when he arrived in Lancaster County with his parents.

Education
John Reynolds attended the public schools in Lancaster and graduated from the First Pennsylvania State Normal School, Millersville, Pennsylvania, (now Millersville University of Pennsylvania) in 1867 and from Columbian College (now George Washington University) in Washington, D.C., in 1895. He was principal of public schools of Bedford, Pennsylvania, 1867-1869. He studied law, was admitted to the bar February 15, 1870, and commenced practice in Bedford. He became publisher and half-owner of the Bedford Gazette in 1872, which he edited until August 1, 1880, when he devoted full attention to his growing law practice.

Political activities

Pennsylvania offices
Reynolds was elected to the Pennsylvania House of Representatives in October 1872, taking his seat in January 1873 as the youngest member of the body at age 24. He was re-elected in 1873 and was actively concerned in framing much of the legislation necessary to put in force the new constitution of the state adopted in 1873. He declined to be a candidate for re-election but was elected prosecuting attorney of Bedford County, serving from 1875 to 1879, at which time he declined renomination. In 1882, he was an unsuccessful candidate for the Pennsylvania Senate. He was president of the board of education of Bedford 1884-1900. He was a delegate to the Democratic National Conventions in 1888 and 1892. He engaged in the banking business in 1893.

National offices
President Grover Cleveland appointed Reynolds Assistant Secretary of the Interior, serving from April 15, 1893, to June 1, 1897. In 1896, unable to support the policies of the Democratic presidential candidate, William Jennings Bryan, Reynolds left the party and actively campaigned for the Republican candidate, William McKinley. In 1897, Reynolds was admitted to the bar of the Supreme Court of the United States.

House of Representatives
In November 1904, Reynolds was elected as a Republican to the United States House of Representatives for the 59th, 60th, and 61st Congresses.

Pennsylvania Lieutenant Governor
He resigned in 1911 to become the tenth lieutenant governor of Pennsylvania, which he held from January 17, 1911 to January 19, 1915. He resumed the practice of law and again engaged in banking in Bedford. He was a member of the commission to revise the banking laws of the State of Pennsylvania 1917-1925.

Death and burial
Reynolds died in Bedford and is interred in Bedford Cemetery. He was an active member of the Episcopal church, having served as vestryman, warden and superintendent of the Sunday-school. He was also a Royal Arch Mason and a Knight Templar.

References

External links

BEDFORD, Biographical Review, 1899, Bedford Co., PA, pp. 183 – 242

The Political Graveyard

Members of the Pennsylvania House of Representatives
Lieutenant Governors of Pennsylvania
Pennsylvania Democrats
People from Lancaster County, Pennsylvania
American people of Irish descent
1848 births
1933 deaths
Republican Party members of the United States House of Representatives from Pennsylvania
Columbian College of Arts and Sciences alumni